Son Dae-Ho (born September 11, 1981) is a South Korean football player. Son is a tough defender who utilizes his own height and strong pressure. His nickname is 'tough guy' in K-League.

Club career 
In 2002, Son joined Suwon Samsung Bluewings, and in 2005, he transferred to Chunnam Dragons. However, he was traded with Kim Do-Kyun and transferred to Seongnam Ilhwa Chunma. In 2007, he contributed much to his team and Seongnam Ilhwa Chunma got second place in the league. However, in 2008, the coach changed from Kim Hak-Beom to Shin Tae-Yong due to the poor performance and he got traded Incheon United After that, in order to finish his military duty, he tried to enter Sangju Sangmu Phoenix. But failed with date calculation, he got started the Social Service Personnel, the supplement system of the military duty. He returned to Incheon United in January 2012, playing as defensive midfielder for Incheon United with Kim Nam-il. His performance was prodigious in terms of both quantity and quality with his veteran experience in spite of his two years career break.

On 9 November 2014, Son signed a one-year-deal with Chinese Super League side Hangzhou Greentown.

International career 
He got chosen by Pim Verbeek who was the head coach of the Australian national football team. He regarded Son Dae-Ho's strength and power very high. He made his debut June 2, 2007 versus Netherlands, and he was a regular midfielder in 2007 AFC Asian Cup and made Korean national football team semi-final.

Career statistics

References

External links
 
 National Team Player Record 
 

1981 births
Living people
Association football midfielders
South Korean footballers
South Korea international footballers
2007 AFC Asian Cup players
Suwon Samsung Bluewings players
Jeonnam Dragons players
Seongnam FC players
Incheon United FC players
Zhejiang Professional F.C. players
Son Dae-ho
K League 1 players
Chinese Super League players
Son Dae-ho
Expatriate footballers in China
Expatriate footballers in Thailand
South Korean expatriate sportspeople in China
South Korean expatriate sportspeople in Thailand
People from Pohang
Sportspeople from North Gyeongsang Province